Azerbaijan competed in the Summer Olympic Games as an independent nation for the first time at the 1996 Summer Olympics in Atlanta, United States.  Previously, Azerbaijani athletes competed for the Unified Team at the 1992 Summer Olympics. 23 competitors, 20 men and 3 women, took part in 23 events in 9 sports.

Medalists

Athletics

Key
 Note–Ranks given for track events are within the athlete's heat only
 Q = Qualified for the next round
 q = Qualified for the next round as a fastest loser or, in field events, by position without achieving the qualifying target
 NR = National record
 N/A = Round not applicable for the event
 Bye = Athlete not required to compete in round

Men
Track & road events

Field events

Women
Track & road events

Boxing

Diving

Men

Fencing

Judo

Men
Nazim Guseynov
Women
Zulfiya Guseynova

Shooting

Swimming

Weightlifting

Men's Light-Heavyweight
Tofig Heydarov
 Final — 150.0 + 180.0 = 330.0 (→ 11th place)

Wrestling 

Key
  - Victory by Fall.
  - Decision by Points - the loser with technical points.
  - Decision by Points - the loser without technical points.
Men's freestyle

Nations at the 1996 Summer Olympics
1996
1996 in Azerbaijani sport

References